Chelyocarpus ulei is a species of palm tree that is native to the western Amazon.

Description
Chelyocarpus ulei is a single-stemmed palm with fan-shaped leaves. The plant is found in rainforest regions, usually under the 500m elevation. It is prevalent in Northern Brazil, Colombia, Ecuador, and Peru. It is harvested to make salt from the burned ashes of the trunk.

Taxonomy
Chelyocarpus ulei was described by Carl Dammer in 1920.

References

ulei
Flora of the Amazon
Flora of Brazil
Flora of Colombia
Flora of Ecuador
Trees of South America
Trees of Peru
Taxa named by Carl Lebrecht Udo Dammer